The Albion–Jacana line is a railway line in the western suburbs of Melbourne, Australia. Linking Albion on the Sunbury line to Jacana on the Craigieburn line, it is primarily used by freight trains and has no overhead wires, passenger stations or platforms.

History 
The line was opened on 1 July 1929 to allow freight trains to avoid the steeper grades and busy suburban traffic on the Broadmeadows line via Essendon. Initially consisting of two broad gauge tracks, in 1962 the track on the eastern side was converted to standard gauge as part of the Melbourne to Sydney gauge standardisation project.

Melbourne Airport rail link

The Albion–Jacana railway line is a major section of the present preferred option for the proposed rail link to Melbourne Airport running via Sunshine station to the Melbourne central business district. The extra land required to build the link was confirmed as being reserved by the State Government in 2002.

In March 2013, the State Government confirmed that the Albion–Jacana corridor would be part of the proposed Melbourne Airport rail link.

Description
Built as a double track railway, two major steel viaducts were required to cross the Maribyrnong River and Moonee Ponds Creek valleys.

Today the track on the eastern side is standard gauge and part of the North East standard gauge line with two crossing loops. The parallel broad gauge also has two crossing loops, each located before rejoining the main lines, and has a 20 km/h speed limit due to the poor track condition.

V/Line Albury and NSW TrainLink XPT passenger services operate on the standard gauge line.

Standard gauge in blue, broad gauge in red. Distances on the line are measured via Albion.

References

External links
1979 Signalling diagram: Albion to Broadmeadows

Railway lines in Melbourne
Railway lines opened in 1929
1929 establishments in Australia
Transport in the City of Merri-bek
Transport in the City of Brimbank
Transport in the City of Moonee Valley